is a Japanese term for men who have a culturally feminine gender expression. This includes amongst others males with feminine appearances, or those cross-dressing.  is a play on the word  ("boy", from the characters for 'male' and 'child'), which is also pronounced ; in the slang term, the kanji for "child" is substituted with "daughter"/"girl".

Its popularity increased around 2009, with the rise of dedicated maid cafés, fashion stores, cosmetic products, and a range of popular media in the  culture. It is often combined with the cosplay of female fictional characters by men (crossplay).

By extension,  is also a genre of media and fiction about feminine-looking or feminine-dressing men, and often contains erotic or romantic elements. It is mainly aimed at male audience but also appears in a lot of  manga.  characters have also begun to appear in mainstream Japanese popular entertainment such as manga, anime, and video games.

See also
Genderless fashion in Japan

References

Anime and manga terminology
Male stock characters in anime and manga
Japanese words and phrases
Femininity